5150 may refer to:
, section 5150 of California's Welfare and Institutions Code
By extension, a person who is gravely disabled through mental illness
5150 Studios, Eddie Van Halen's home recording studio, named after the psychiatric hold code section
Peavey 5150 Amplifier, signature model for Eddie Van Halen
5150 (album), a 1986 album by Van Halen
5150: Home 4 tha Sick, a 1992 EP by Eazy-E
IBM 5150, model designation for the IBM Personal Computer
Dell Inspiron#Inspiron 5150
5150 series, a triathlon series organized by the World Triathlon Corporation
5150 (professional wrestling), an incarnation of the Latin American Exchange in MLW
 A nickname for subsidized biodiesel in Indonesia

Songs
"5150", a song by The Oral Cigarettes
"5150", a song by Love Fame Tragedy
"5150", a song by Tsunami Bomb from the album The Definitive Act
”5150”, a 1995 song by Luniz from the album Operation Stackola
"5150", a song by Machine Gun Kelly from the album Mainstream Sellout
"E5150", a song by Black Sabbath from the 1981 album Mob Rules
"5-1-5-0", a song by Dierks Bentley from the album Home